Ovie Phillip Mughelli (born June 10, 1980) is a former American football fullback who last played for the Atlanta Falcons of the National Football League (NFL).  After playing college football for Wake Forest University, he was drafted in the fourth round of the 2003 NFL Draft by the Baltimore Ravens.

Mughelli also currently serves as a co-host on the all-digital sports network, 120 Sports.

High school career
Mughelli attended Porter-Gaud School and a letterman in football, basketball, tennis, and track & field. In football, he rushed for more than 4,500 yards and scored 69 touchdowns during his career at Porter-Gaud, and he rushed for 2,167 yards and 29 touchdowns as a senior. He was named the team's MVP for three years, was a three-time All-Conference selection, and as a senior, he was also named the State Player of the Year in his classification and was a Regional All-Star selection in all division. He also led the team to a state title in 1996 and state runner-up honors during his senior year in 1997 to Laurence Manning Academy 32-30.

College career
Mughelli attended Wake Forest University, where he was a letterman for the Wake Forest Demon Deacons football team.  A fullback in college, Ovie was a first-team All-Atlantic Coast Conference (ACC) selection at that position.  He started every game in his senior year as a Demon Deacon, coming in with the third highest rushing touchdown record in school history.  He was rated the No. 1 fullback by USA Today.

Professional career

Baltimore Ravens
Mughelli was selected with the 134th overall pick (fourth round) of the 2003 NFL Draft by the Baltimore Ravens; the choice was a compensatory pick. He was the second fullback selected in Baltimore's franchise history (the first was Steve Lee in the sixth round of the 1997 NFL Draft); he was also the first ever Wake Forest player selected by the team.

It was during the 2006 season that Mughelli recorded his first ever NFL touchdown. He also went all-Pro for the first time in his career.

Atlanta Falcons
In 2007, Mughelli signed with the Atlanta Falcons to block for running backs Warrick Dunn and Jerious Norwood. On March 2, Mughelli signed a 6-year, $18 million contract with a $5 million signing bonus. The contract was the largest given to a fullback in NFL history at the time.

In 2010, Mughelli went all-Pro for the second time in his career, the first being in 2006, and was elected to his first ever Pro Bowl. He also recorded the fourth receiving touchdown of his career.

He was released by the Falcons on May 8, 2012.

St. Louis Rams
Mughelli signed a contract with the St. Louis Rams on July 28, 2012.  He was released by the team on August 31, 2012.

Radio career
In 2012, Mughelli joined WZGC "92.9 the Game" sports station in Atlanta as a host.

Sports hosting career

In 2014, Mughelli joined the all-digital sports network, 120 Sports. 120 Sports launched on June 25, 2014.

References

External links
 Official website
 
 Atlanta Falcons bio
 
 Mughelli rings NASDAQ closing bell

1980 births
Living people
African-American players of American football
Sportspeople from Charleston, South Carolina
American football fullbacks
Harvard Business School alumni
Wake Forest Demon Deacons football players
Baltimore Ravens players
Atlanta Falcons players
American sportspeople of Nigerian descent
Radio personalities from Atlanta
American sports radio personalities
Players of American football from South Carolina
21st-century African-American sportspeople
20th-century African-American people